Nazaré da Mata is a city located in the state of Pernambuco, Brazil. Located  at 62 km from Recife, capital of the state of Pernambuco. It has an estimated (IBGE 2020) population of 32,573 people, and it is well known as the town of Maracatu Rural  and its engenhos de cana-de-açúcar (sugarcane plantations houses). It is the seat of the Roman Catholic Diocese of Nazaré.

Geography
 State - Pernambuco
 Region - Zona da mata Pernambucana
 Boundaries - Aliança, Condado and Itaquitinga   (N);  Tracunhaém   (S and E);  Carpina and Buenos Aires  (W); Vitória de Santo Antão   (E)
 Area - 150.8 km2
 Elevation - 89 m
 Hydrography - Goiana River
 Vegetation - Subcaducifólia forest
 Climate - Hot tropical and humid
 Annual average temperature - 25.3 c
 Distance to Recife - 62 km

Economy

The main economic activities in Nazaré da Mata are based in food and beverage industry, commerce and agribusiness, especially sugarcane; and livestock such as poultry, cattle, goats and sheep.

Economic indicators

Economy by Sector
2006

Health indicators

References

Municipalities in Pernambuco